Shero is the tenth studio album by Taiwanese Mandopop girl group S.H.E. It was released on 26 March 2010 by HIM International Music in two editions: Shero (Gorgeous Edition) (華麗絢爛版) with a bonus DVD of nine music videos from 2008 to 2009 and Shero (Avant-garde Edition) (前衛時尚版) with a bonus DVD of S.H.E’s FM S.H.E Taipei Concert.

The album features 10 new tracks. The title track, "Shero" is written by Mayday's Ashin and 831 vocalist, Up Lee. The song encourages females to just be their own 'Shero' if they can't find their 'Hero'. It was also the theme song for 2010 Taipei International Flower Expo. The track "愛就對了" (Love So Right) is a cover of Kate Voegele's "Angel". "Desert Island", a collaboration with Judy Chou, is the best-selling digital single of all time, with digital sales of 18.6 million.

The track "Shero" and "愛就對了" (Love So Right) are listed at number 7 and 28 respectively on Hit Fm Taiwan's Hit Fm Annual Top 100 Singles Chart (Hit-Fm年度百首單曲) for 2010. The album is the third best selling album in Taiwan in 2010, with 68,000 copies sold. Download singles, ringtones and ringback tones from the album's tracks sold a collective total of 43.3 million copies in China.

Track listing

Bonus DVD

Gorgeous Version (2008/2009 MV)
 "宇宙小姐" MV
 "沿海公路的出口" MV
 "女孩當自強" MV
 "安靜了" MV
 "月光手札" MV
 "612星球" MV
 "可愛萬歲" MV
 "夢田" MV
 "鎖住時間" MV

Avant-garde Version (FM S.H.E Taipei Concert)
 呼叫S.H.E宇宙警報VCR
 "宇宙小姐"
 "我愛煩惱"
 "我是火星人"
 "612星球"
 "女孩當自強"
 "店小二"
 "安靜了"
 "沿海公路的出口"

Music videos
In the music video of "愛就對了" (Just Love), Hebe and Bryant Chang play a couple in a war of love. Because of the difference in their heights, the scene where they needed to jump and hug mid-air took about 50 tries to complete. The MV for "你不會" (You Won't) stars Taiwanese actress Li Jia Ying as the female lead.

References

External links
 S.H.E discography@HIM International Music 

2010 albums
S.H.E albums
HIM International Music albums